Hindrik Harmannus Arnoldus "Henk" Grol (born 14 April 1985 in Veendam) is a retired Dutch judoka.

Judo career
Grol competed in the 2007 European Judo Championships in Belgrade, Serbia in the men's under 90 kg, as a replacement for Mark Huizinga, who cancelled last minute due to personal problems.

He won gold in the men's under 100-kilo class at the 2008 European Judo Championships in Lisbon, Portugal. He was the youngest European Champion of that year, only 22 years old.

After a highly competitive race against Elco van der Geest, Grol ended up to be the 2008 representative for the men's 100 kg category for the Netherlands at the 2008 Olympics in Beijing. There he reached the semifinals, where he was beaten by Askhat Zhitkeyev from Kazakhstan. He went on to win bronze beating Levan Zhorzholiani from Georgia.

He competed at the 2012 Summer Olympics, reaching the quarter-finals, where he lost to Dimitri Peters of Germany.  Grol went on to win the bronze medal beating Hwang Hee-tae in his bronze medal match.

He competed at the 2018 European Judo Championships in Tel Aviv where he ended third.

In 2021, he won one of the bronze medals in his event at the 2021 Judo World Masters held in Doha, Qatar.

Outside of Judo
After the 2016 Olympics in Rio de Janeiro he considered starting a mixed martial arts career and trained with Gegard Mousasi in Amsterdam. Eventually he decided to quit training MMA due to safety considerations.

References

External links

 
 
 
 

1985 births
Living people
Dutch male judoka
European Games gold medalists for the Netherlands
European Games medalists in judo
Judoka at the 2008 Summer Olympics
Judoka at the 2012 Summer Olympics
Judoka at the 2016 Summer Olympics
Judoka at the 2015 European Games
Medalists at the 2008 Summer Olympics
Medalists at the 2012 Summer Olympics
Olympic bronze medalists for the Netherlands
Olympic judoka of the Netherlands
Olympic medalists in judo
People from Veendam
Judoka at the 2019 European Games
European Games bronze medalists for the Netherlands
Judoka at the 2020 Summer Olympics
21st-century Dutch people
Sportspeople from Groningen (province)